Mary Brandon may refer to:

 Mary Brandon, Baroness Monteagle (1510 – 1540), English noblewoman
Mary, the French Queen (1496–1533), wife of Charles Brandon
Mary Brandon (singer), see Algonquin Round Table
Mary (née Brandon) Martin, founder of Lower Brandon Plantation

See also
Maryann Brandon, American film editor